The 1996 du Maurier Open was a tennis tournament played on outdoor hard courts. It was the 107th edition of the Canada Masters and was part of the Mercedes Super 9 of the 1996 ATP Tour and of Tier I of the 1996 WTA Tour. The men's event took place at the National Tennis Centre in Toronto from August 5 through August 11, 1996, while the women's event took place at the du Maurier Stadium in Montreal from August 19 through August 26, 1996.

Finals

Men's singles

 Wayne Ferreira defeated  Todd Woodbridge 6–2, 6–4
 It was Ferreira's 2nd title of the year and the 18th of his career. It was his 3rd Masters title.

Women's singles

 Monica Seles defeated  Arantxa Sánchez Vicario 6–1, 7–6(7–2)
 It was Seles' 3rd title of the year and the 41st of her career. It was her 1st Tier I title of the year and her 6th overall. It was also her 2nd consecutive title at the event after winning in 1995.

Men's doubles

 Patrick Galbraith /  Paul Haarhuis defeated  Mark Knowles /  Daniel Nestor 7–6, 6–3
 It was Galbraith's 3rd title of the year and the 27th of his career. It was Haarhuis' 1st title of the year and the 29th of his career.

Women's doubles

 Larisa Neiland /  Arantxa Sánchez Vicario defeated  Mary Joe Fernandez /  Helena Suková 7–6(7–1) (Fernandez and Suková retired)
 It was Neiland's 4th title of the year and the 60th of her career. It was Sánchez Vicario's 11th title of the year and the 73rd of her career.

References

External links
 
 Association of Tennis Professionals (ATP) tournament profile
 Women's Tennis Association (WTA) tournament profile

 
du Maurier Open
du Maurier Open
Canadian Open (tennis)
1996 in Canadian tennis